Laanecoorie Weir or Laanecoorie Reservoir, is a water storage for irrigation and domestic purposes on the Loddon River, near the towns of Laanecoorie, Victoria and Eddington, Victoria. It was constructed by contractor Andrew O'Keefe (engineer) (died 1904) in conjunction with Joshua Thomas Noble Anderson. This was the second irrigation scheme for Victoria after the Goulburn Weir. Construction commenced in 1889 and took three years to complete. The largest outlet valves in Victoria, manufactured by the United Iron Work of Abraham Roberts, were installed at the weir in 1891.

The great flood of 1909 breached the weir, sending 18.3 million cubic metres of water through the opening and causing severe damage to all towns downstream.

The first bridge at Laanecoorie over the Loddon River was built in 1870, but was destroyed in the flood of 1909, along with the weir. The famous World War I general, Sir John Monash, designed and built a new bridge of reinforced concrete beam and slab construction, which still remains today.

The present capacity of the Laanecoorie Reservoir is about 7770 ML, although substantial siltation since its construction has reduced the original capacity by an estimated 12000 ML.  The towns of Tarnagulla, Dunolly, and Laanecoorie obtain supply by diversion from the Loddon River downstream of the reservoir.

See also

 List of dams and reservoirs in Victoria

References

Further reading
 
 

Dams in Victoria (Australia)
North-Central catchment
Rivers of Loddon Mallee (region)
Irrigation in Australia